Caloptilia kadsurae is a moth of the family Gracillariidae. It is known from Japan (Honshū, Kyūshū and the Ryukyu Islands).

The wingspan is 13–14 mm.

The larvae feed on Kadsura japonica. They probably mine the leaves of their host plant.

References

kadsurae
Moths of Japan
Moths described in 1966